Komiti Skopje are a supporters group that follows the Macedonian sports clubs that compete under the Vardar banner, mainly FK Vardar in football and RK Vardar in handball.

History
The Ultras group KOMITI was noticed for the first time in the year 1985, on 'Zapad' (West Stand), where the most fanatic fans of Vardar always operated. Two years later during the summer of 4 June 1987 at the City Stadium in Skopje there was a derby match of the Yugoslav league at that time between Vardar Skopje and Red Star Belgrade (3:1). On 'Zapad' for the first time since existence of the club a banner with the writing 'KOMITI' was noticed. The idea contained the establishment of a massive and strong Macedonian ultra scene. The goal was for 'KOMITI' to make the prominent post of all activities and events on the West Stand. As the most acceptable name of the group was selected 'KOMITI'.

The reason for it was simple: When the Balkans were in the Middle Ages under occupation by the Ottomans, young Macedonians under the name 'KOMITI' had organized themselves, in order to fight against the tyranny. This name is very strong and the meaning of the name is closely linked with their goals, this is why they decided not to use one like the standard unimaginative names such as Brigate, Commando, Ultras, Boys etc. And so, the name 'KOMITI' was selected for the new born Ultra group.

'KOMITI' also have subgroups, some of them are: 'Red Black Drinkers', 'Skinheads' who call themselves 'OI Warriors' and 'Metal Force'. Until 1999, 'Combat 87' was also a strong and dominating subgroup of 'Komiti', however they existed by the separation of some members. Not to forget is also the 'Golden Lords', a subgroup from the Karpoš part of Skopje, on 11 November 1997 they were formed. The number of members is at 200, on derby up to 700. The older generation of Komiti, the so-called 'Stara Garda' (old guard), sits today on 'Jug' (South Stand) and counts up to 30 men, with up to 50 for important matches.

There is no city in Macedonia or ex-Yugoslavia, which 'KOMITI' have not visited. The largest away travel was in the year 1992 with about 900 supporters in Bitola for the league match between Pelister Bitola and Vardar Skopje. Also 'KOMITI' have made numerous away trips in Europe, like Bordeaux, Halmstad, Brussels, Valencia, Vienna, Bucharest, Kyiv, Southampton, Rome and Gent. Not to forget is the away game on 3 September 2000 in Bratislava at the international match between Slovakia and Macedonia. Worth mentioning is that, one week before the match, in the Slovakian media it was reported that one of the largest and strongest Ultra groups would come from the Balkans to the match. The Slovakian police was also already informed, about what happened two weeks before in the city derby between Vardar and Sloga Jugomagnat in the Macedonian league and therefore sent a special-police force into the stadium. During the second minute of the game started the inevitable argument with the cops, what followed was a scene of police brutality. The last big away travel in Europe was on 17 July 2004 during the Intertoto Cup match between Schalke 04 and Vardar Skopje. 'KOMITI' also have active members outside of Macedonia, in places like Australia, America, Sweden and Germany (Frankfurt, Duesseldorf, Bremen or Nuremberg). These help them particularly with away games of FK Vardar or the Macedonian national team.

On 27 April 2002 'Komiti' celebrated their 15-years of existence, also on that date it was the anniversary of the golden generation of FK Vardar in 1987 with players such as Darko Pancev, Ilija Najdoski, Vasil Ringov, Boban Babunski, Dragan Kanatlarovski and many more, which won the championship in the Yugoslav league. The spectacle at the 'Gradski' stadium in Skopje attracted about 30,000 spectators. At the beginning of the second half and at the end of the game, 'Komiti' made the traditional pyro show with smoke bombs, flares and Bengal fires. Five years later, they celebrated their 20th anniversary at a friendly match between Vardar and Partizan with another impressive pyro show.

'KOMITI' have no friends in the Macedonian scene, because their slogan is: “Alone against all”. Except for the good relationship with 'Vojvodi' from Tetovo, the relationships with the other groups is not so good. There are the most frequent arguments with the groups of the so-called 'Sverceri' (smugglers) of the city rival Sloga Jugomagnat, with 'Majmuni' from Pobeda Prilep and especially their biggest rivals Čkembari from Pelister Bitola. It is interesting that they were in alliance with Lozari from Kavadarci who are then left the 'Komiti' and teamed up with the Komiti's biggest rivals Čkembari.

Today 'Komiti' have an executive committee including associated president and firm task dispatching (fan articles, flags, photo, actions, finances, general administration and internet). They help them self to a large extent, by selling fan articles and investing the money into new actions. The future of 'KOMITI' depends above all on the fact whether they succeed to integrate more young members into the hard core and find future guidance people. In order to realize their goal, they need better results from the club, both in the domestic league and in European Cups, so they can bring back the glory days of the 1980s and early 1990s. Despite prohibitions, obstructions, repression and negative propaganda from the media and police given to the name Komiti, they have always stayed strong and supported their club and country.

Brother groups: Vojvodi (Tetovo) and Ultras Gelsenkirchen (Gelsenkirchen)

References

External links
Official website

MakTifo

Ultras groups
FK Vardar